This is a list of museums in Ivory Coast.

List 

 Musée Adja Swa
 Musée Binger de Zaranou
 Musée Charles et Marguerithe Bieth
 Musée des Armées
 Musée des Civilisations de Cort d'Ivore
 Musée du Parc M'Ploussoue de Bonoua
 Musée Municipal d'Art Contemporain de Cocody
 Musée National du Costume
 Musée Régional Peleforo Gbon Coulibaly

See also 
 List of museums

External links 
 Museums in Ivory Coast

 
Ivory Coast
Museums
Museums
Museums
Ivory Coast